Furnace Creek is a stream in Washington County in the U.S. state of Missouri. It is a tributary of the Big River.

The stream headwaters are at  about five miles south of Potosi and the stream flows south to southeast to its confluence with the Big River is at  adjacent to Missouri Route 21 three miles north of Caledonia.

Furnace Creek was named for a blast furnace near its course.

See also
List of rivers of Missouri

References

Rivers of Washington County, Missouri
Rivers of Missouri